Eye of the Wind is a brigantine built in 1911 at the C. H. Lühring shipyard in Brake, Germany, originally as a topsail schooner named Friedrich.

History
Friedrich was initially used as a schooner for the South American hide trade. In 1923 she was registered in Sweden, under the name Merry, and was used for transport in the Baltic and North seas and for fishing herring off the coast of Iceland during summer. In 1969, then stripped of her masts and sailing as a motor vessel, she was severely damaged in a fire that almost destroyed her.

In 1973 a group of sailing enthusiasts, including Anthony "Tiger" Timbs, who later became her Master, began rebuilding her at Faversham, England. In this restoration she was re-rigged as a brigantine by Master Rigger Wally Buchanan. After the restoration was completed she was given the name Eye of the Wind, inspired by Sir Peter Scott's 1961 book. In October 1976 she set sail for Australia, the first voyage since the restoration, three years and eight months after her purchase by the new owners.

In 1978, she set sail from Plymouth as the flagship of Operation Drake, a 2-year sailing expedition, which brought her back to London in December 1980.

While under the care of Tiger Timbs the ship was commissioned for several film roles. During the filming of Tai-Pan, the film producers fitted her with a set of tan sails in order to be able to play two different ships. The tan sails were retained after filming.

In 2001, she was taken over by a new owner and registered in Gilleleje, Denmark. Her interior underwent substantial renovations. Also, the new owners decided to call her rig a brig. This was only a change of naming, the rig remained the same since the filming of Tai Pan. Again in 2009 she found a new owner with the Forum Media Group, Germany.

Published Books
Eye of the Wind, by E. A. Mitchener (1984 Published by the author 1984)
Eye of the Wind - Einem Traum auf der Spur (German), by Harald Focke and Ulf Kaack, 2014, Forum Media 
The Ship That Changed A Thousand Lives - over a century of history and stories, published by Ina Koys, 2019 , Amazon only

Filmography

Eye of the Wind has been used for several film and television roles.

The Blue Lagoon (1980) where the ship appears as the Northumberland.
White Squall (1996) as the Albatross.
Tai-Pan (1986) as the Morning Cloud and the White Witch.
Nate & Hayes (1983) as the Leonora.
Lost at Sea: The Search for Longitude (1998), an episode of the U.S. television series NOVA.

References

External links
Eye of the Wind, by E. A. Mitchener
Eye of the Wind Family
Present Owners
Video, on youtube, of the ship being sailed.

Schooners
Ships built in Germany
1911 ships